Darry Douglas Beckwith, Jr. (born May 15, 1987) is a former gridiron football linebacker. He was signed by the San Diego Chargers as an undrafted free agent in 2009. He played college football at LSU.

He has also been a member of the Indianapolis Colts and New Orleans Saints.

His cousin Kendell Beckwith is a rookie linebacker for the Tampa Bay Buccaneers and will begin his NFL career during the 2017 season.

Early years
Beckwith played high school football at Parkview Baptist High School in Baton Rouge, LA.

Professional career

Pre-draft
Leading up to the 2009 NFL Draft, Beckwith was considered a second-round prospect at one point.

San Diego Chargers
After not being selected in the 2009 NFL Draft, Beckwith was signed as an undrafted free agent by the San Diego Chargers. He was waived on September 5 during final roster cuts, and subsequently re-signed to the practice squad on September 6. His practice squad contract expired at the end of the 2009 season. Beckwith signed a future contract with the team on February 10, 2010.

Indianapolis Colts
Beckwith spent two seasons in San Diego before signing with the Indianapolis Colts on August 1, 2011. He was waived the following day.

New Orleans Saints
Beckwith spent time on the New Orleans Saints practice team in 2012.

Toronto Argonauts
On March 20, 2013, Beckwith signed with the Toronto Argonauts of the Canadian Football League. He was released by the Argonauts on May 2, 2013.

References

External links
LSU Tigers bio
San Diego Chargers bio

1987 births
Living people
Players of American football from Baton Rouge, Louisiana
American football linebackers
LSU Tigers football players
San Diego Chargers players
Indianapolis Colts players